Pholiota limonella is a mushroom of the genus Pholiota.  It is saprobic, growing on coniferous tree stumps and logs. Its subspecies include P. abietis, P. connata, and P. subvelutipes. This mushroom is remarked as “not edible”, but commented as “taste mild” in Phillips (2010); However there was a project in Hubei of China trying to “tame” the mushroom for growing massively for food.

See also
List of Pholiota species

References

External links

 

Fungi described in 1878
Inedible fungi
Strophariaceae
Taxa named by Charles Horton Peck